The Şoimul class was a pair of spar torpedo boats of the Romanian Navy. They were built in 1882 and served until the end of the 1940s.

Construction and specifications
The two boats were built by Yarrow in London. Armament consisted of one spar torpedo, maneuvered from an armored conning tower astern. Each boat had a complement of eight.

Career
The two boats are indicated to have served until the Second World War and in the few years afterwards.

References 

1882 ships
World War I naval ships of Romania
Ships built in Poplar
Torpedo boats of the Romanian Naval Forces
World War II naval ships of Romania